Below is the list of populated places in Iğdır Province, Turkey by district. In the following lists first place in each list is the administrative center of the district.

Iğdır
 Iğdır
 Ağaver, Iğdır
 Akyumak, Iğdır
 Alibeyköy, Iğdır
 Asma, Iğdır
 Aşağıçarıkçı, Iğdır
 Aşağıerhacı, Iğdır
 Bayraktutan, Iğdır
 Bendemurat, Iğdır
 Çakırtaş, Iğdır
 Çalpala, Iğdır
 Çilli, Iğdır
 Elmagöl, Iğdır
 Enginalan, Iğdır
 Evci, Iğdır
 Gülpınar, Iğdır
 Güngörmez, Iğdır
 Hakmehmet, Iğdır
 Halfeli, Iğdır
 Harmandöven, Iğdır
 Hoşhaber, Iğdır
 Kadıkışlak, Iğdır
 Karaçomak, Iğdır
 Karagüney, Iğdır
 Karakuyu, Iğdır
 Kasımcan, Iğdır
 Kazancı, Iğdır
 Kuzugüden, Iğdır
 Küllük, Iğdır
 Melekli, Iğdır
 Mezraa, Iğdır
 Necefali, Iğdır
 Nişankaya, Iğdır
 Obaköy, Iğdır
 Örüşmüş, Iğdır
 Özdemir, Iğdır
 Pınarbaşı, Iğdır
 Sarıçoban, Iğdır
 Suveren, Iğdır
 Tacirli, Iğdır
 Taşlıca, Iğdır
 Yaycı, Iğdır
 Yukarıçarıkçı, Iğdır
 Yüzbaşılar, Iğdır

Aralık
 Aralık
 Adetli, Aralık
 Aşağıaratan, Aralık
 Aşağıçamurlu, Aralık
 Aşağıçiftlik, Aralık
 Aşağıtopraklı, Aralık
 Babacan, Aralık
 Emince, Aralık
 Gödekli, Aralık
 Hacıağa, Aralık
 Hasanhan, Aralık
 Karahacılı, Aralık
 Kırçiçeği, Aralık
 Kolikent, Aralık
 Ramazankent, Aralık
 Saraçlı, Aralık
 Tazeköy, Aralık
 Yenidoğan, Aralık
 Yukarıaratan, Aralık
 Yukarıçamurlu, Aralık
 Yukarıçiftlik, Aralık
 Yukarıtopraklı, Aralık

Karakoyunlu
 Karakoyunlu
 Aktaş, Karakoyunlu
 Aşağıalican, Karakoyunlu
 Bayatdoğanşalı, Karakoyunlu
 Bekirhanlı, Karakoyunlu
 Bulakbaşı, Karakoyunlu
 Gökçeli, Karakoyunlu
 Kacardoğanşalı, Karakoyunlu
 Kerimbeyli, Karakoyunlu
 Koçkıran, Karakoyunlu
 Mürşitali, Karakoyunlu
 Şıracı, Karakoyunlu
 Taşburun, Karakoyunlu
 Yazlık, Karakoyunlu
 Yukarıalican, Karakoyunlu
 Zülfikarköy, Karakoyunlu

Tuzluca
 Tuzluca
 Abbasgöl, Tuzluca
 Ağabey, Tuzluca
 Akdeğirmen, Tuzluca
 Akdiz, Tuzluca
 Akoluk, Tuzluca
 Alhanlı, Tuzluca
 Aliköse, Tuzluca
 Arslanlı, Tuzluca
 Aşağı Çıyrıklı, Tuzluca
 Aşağıaktaş, Tuzluca
 Aşağıcivanlı, Tuzluca
 Aşağıkatırlı, Tuzluca
 Aşağısutaşı, Tuzluca
 Badilli, Tuzluca
 Bağlan, Tuzluca
 Bahçecik, Tuzluca
 Bahçelimeydan, Tuzluca
 Beyoğlu, Tuzluca
 Bostanlı, Tuzluca
 Buruksu, Tuzluca
 Canderviş, Tuzluca
 Çıraklı, Tuzluca
 Çiçekli, Tuzluca
 Doğanyurt, Tuzluca
 Eğrekdere, Tuzluca
 Elmalık, Tuzluca
 Gaziler, Tuzluca
 Gedikli, Tuzluca
 Göktaş, Tuzluca
 Güllüce, Tuzluca
 Güzeldere, Tuzluca
 Hadımlı, Tuzluca
 Hamurkesen, Tuzluca
 Hasankent, Tuzluca
 İnce, Tuzluca
 İncesu, Tuzluca
 Kalaça, Tuzluca
 Kamışlı, Tuzluca
 Kandilli, Tuzluca
 Karabulak, Tuzluca
 Karacören, Tuzluca
 Karakoyun, Tuzluca
 Karanlık, Tuzluca
 Karataş, Tuzluca
 Kayakışlak, Tuzluca
 Kayaören, Tuzluca
 Kazkoparan, Tuzluca
 Kelekli, Tuzluca
 Kılıçlı, Tuzluca
 Kırkbulak, Tuzluca
 Kıznefer, Tuzluca
 Köprübaşı, Tuzluca
 Kula, Tuzluca
 Kumbulak, Tuzluca
 Kuruağaç, Tuzluca
 Küçükova, Tuzluca
 Laleli, Tuzluca
 Mollakamer, Tuzluca
 Nahırkıran, Tuzluca
 Ombulak, Tuzluca
 Ortabucak, Tuzluca
 Osmanköy, Tuzluca
 Özlü, Tuzluca
 Pirdemir, Tuzluca
 Sarıabdal, Tuzluca
 Sarıbulak, Tuzluca
 Soğukbulak, Tuzluca
 Söğütlü, Tuzluca
 Sürmeli, Tuzluca
 Taşuçan, Tuzluca
 Turabi, Tuzluca
 Tutak, Tuzluca
 Uğruca, Tuzluca
 Üçkaya, Tuzluca
 Ünlendi, Tuzluca
 Yağlı, Tuzluca
 Yassıbulak, Tuzluca
 Yaylacık, Tuzluca
 Yukarıaktaş, Tuzluca
 Yukarıcivanlı, Tuzluca
 Yüceotak, Tuzluca

References 

Igdir
List